The United Trade Union of Guinean Workers (Union syndicale des travailleurs de Guinée, USTG) is a national trade union center in Guinea. It is affiliated with the International Trade Union Confederation.

References

Trade unions in Guinea
International Trade Union Confederation